Aleksandrovac is a village in the Municipalities of Serbia. According to the 2002 census, the village has a population of 1546 people.

References

Populated places in Braničevo District